Ismael Diawara (born 11 November 1994) is a professional footballer who plays as a goalkeeper for Allsvenskan club Malmö FF. Born in Sweden, he plays for the Mali national team.

Club career

Malmö FF
On 11 August 2021 Diawara joined reigning Swedish champions Malmö FF after leaving Degerfors IF to serve as backup to Johan Dahlin. He made his debut two weeks later following a Dahlin injury in the Champions League playoff return leg against Bulgarian champions Ludogorets Razgrad. After only conceding a goal on a penalty kick, Diawara and Malmö FF held on to their aggregate lead to advance to the group stage of the tournament.

International career
Born in Sweden, Diawara is of Malian descent. He was called up to represent the Mali national team for 2022 FIFA World Cup qualification matches in September 2021. He debuted with Mali in a 1–0 2022 FIFA World Cup qualification win over Uganda on 14 November 2021.

Career statistics

International

Honours

Malmö FF
 Allsvenskan: 2021
 Svenska Cupen: 2021–22

References

1994 births
Living people
Swedish people of Malian descent
Sportspeople from Örebro
Citizens of Mali through descent
Malian footballers
Mali international footballers
Swedish footballers
Swedish sportspeople of African descent
Association football goalkeepers
Rynninge IK players
BK Forward players

Landskrona BoIS players
Motala AIF players
Degerfors IF players
Malmö FF players
Ettan Fotboll players
Superettan players
Allsvenskan players
2021 Africa Cup of Nations players
Swedish expatriate footballers
Expatriate footballers in Norway
Swedish expatriate sportspeople in Norway